The Journal of Austrian-American History is a biannual, open access, peer-reviewed scholarly journal published by Pennsylvania State University Press, and the flagship publication of the Botstiber Institute for Austrian-American Studies. It publishes new research, review essays, and other materials of significance that explore the historic relationship between the United States and Austria, including the lands of the historic Habsburg empire.

By the mid-eighteenth century, as recent scholarship has shown, this historic relationship had already become significant, particularly in the period of the American revolution, while during the American Civil War, Habsburg elites, such as Charles Frederick de Loosey, the Austrian consul in New York, finessed a balance among U.S., Austrian, and Mexican interests.

The conclusion of the First World War reconfigured Austrian-American relations, not least through the redrawing of Austro-Hungarian borders and the financial reconstruction of the First Austrian Republic. These developments constitute notable early peaks in a twentienth-century characterized by a series of high water marks in political, economic, and diplomatic relations between the two countries. Meanwhile, the entertainment industry continues to reshuffle episodes in Austrian-American history, via familiar tropes of imperial Austria, the Cold War, "Coca-Colonization," and more.

Journal content is interdisciplinary and emphasizes transatlantic exchange, across the fields of historical, political science, economics, law, and cultural studies. The Journal is covered in the Scopus abstract and citation database and in ERIH PLUS. It is indexed and accessible via the digital library of the Scholarly Publishing Collective at Duke University Press.

Published Volumes 

The first volume of the Journal of Austrian-American History appeared in 2017. It included articles on Hungarian migrant marriages in the United States, a study of Austrian and Dustbowl refugees, as they appear in Hollywood cinema, and an assessment of Hip hop, Malcolm X, and Muslim activism in Austria.  The volume that followed featured a special issue on migration from Central Europe, together with articles on the ties between the industrialist and arts patron Walter Paepcke, the Hungarian artist László Moholy-Nagy, and an emerging Bauhaus sensibility in Chicago, among others.

The Journal has also presented archival research foregrounding the correspondence of prominent Habsburg-Americans, with articles devoted to John R. Palandech (Ivan Palandačić), the well-known immigrant publisher, politician, and entrepreneur in Chicago, and an essay by Walter D. Kamphoefner on language and loyalty among German Americans during World War I. Oral histories of American diplomatic personnel stationed in Vienna from 1945–55, recorded by the Association for Diplomatic Studies and Training, are also featured.

The 2020 volume includes an investigation of Vienna and the British-American film production, The Third Man, as a locus classicus for postwar espionage, together with an assessment by Günter Bischof of Allied post-World War II occupation and nation-building, and its lessons for the future.  In addition, Jacqueline Vansant edits a special issue on "Austrian Children and Youth Fleeing Nazi Austria," with four contributions, ranging from an essay on Ernst Papanek to an article on intracategorical complexity in the memoirs of young Jewish Austrian emigrants to the United States.

Editorial Board 
The editorial board of the Journal of Austrian-American History is composed of leading scholars in Austrian history in the United States and Europe, including Siegfried Beer, Peter Becker, Günter Bischof,  Gary B. Cohen, Olivia Florek, Farid Hafez, Christian Karner, Teresa Kovacs, Nathan Marcus, Britta McEwen, Peter Meilaender, Martin Nedbal, Nicole M. Phelps, Dominique Reill, and Julia Secklehner.  The editor is Michael Burri.

See also 
 Austrian Americans
Austrian Studies Association
 Foreign relations of the United States
 Foreign relations of Austria
 Transatlantic relations

References

Academic Press academic journals
Austria–United States relations
Habsburg monarchy
Penn State University Press academic journals